Irina Klimovschi (née Nagy; ; 1936 – 2 May 2001) was a Romanian handballer who played for the Romanian national team. At club level, she played for SMTCF Târgu Mureș, Progresul Târgu Mureș, Știința București or Rapid București. Together with Luminița Dinu-Huțupan, she is regarded by Constantin Popescu–Pilică as the greatest Romanian goalkeeper of all time.

International trophies   
European Champions Cup:
Winner: 1961, 1964 

World Championship:
Gold Medalist: 1956, 1960, 1962

Individual awards
 All-Star Goalkeeper of the World Championship: 1956, 1960

Personan life
According to Siebenbürgische Zeitung, her surname was "Klimowski".

References

 
 
1936 births
2001 deaths 
Sportspeople from Târgu Mureș
Romanian female handball players